The Aeroplane and Armament Experimental Establishment (A&AEE) was a research facility for British military aviation from 1918 to 1992. Established at Martlesham Heath, Suffolk, the unit moved in 1939 to Boscombe Down, Wiltshire, where its work continues following privatisation as part of the Qinetiq company.

History
In 1917, the Experimental Aircraft Flight of the Central Flying School was transferred from Upavon, Wiltshire to a site on the heathland at Martlesham, Suffolk, and on 16 January 1917 Martlesham Heath Airfield was officially opened, as an experimental airfield. The unit was renamed the Aeroplane Experimental Unit, Royal Flying Corps. After the end of World War I the site continued to be used and was, once again, renamed as the Aeroplane and Armament Experimental Establishment of the Royal Air Force.

At the outbreak of the Second World War, on 9 September, the A&AEE was removed to RAF Boscombe Down, Wiltshire, owing to the proximity of Martlesham Heath to the east coast and its vulnerability to enemy attack. It remained part of No. 23 Group RAF.

About fifty aircraft and the military and civilian personnel had arrived at Boscombe down by mid-September 1939. The Establishment was declared "open" on 20 September though it lacked access to ranges to test weapons. The site had been established as a regional control centre ("Flying Control") for RAF Bomber Command; the Blind Approach Training and Development Unit was formed there that September. However aircraft operating facilities at the time were a grass field, a small area of hardstanding, five pre-1930s hangars and a single new one, and some other permanent structures. Wartime construction was temporary and underfunded; a concrete runway – considered essential to operate the larger aircraft under test – was not completed until early 1945.

During the course of the war the A&AEE had to expand its facilities as it took on other roles. Its work including testing armaments, performance and acceptance trials for all new service aircraft and testing of "rogue" handling aircraft. It also developed improvements in aircraft equipment such as demisting equipment for windshields and exhaust flame suppression.

In 1946, in common with most other military research establishments, the A&AEE came under the Ministry of Supply. In 1950 it absorbed the Airborne Forces Experimental Establishment. When the Ministry of Supply was wound up in 1959 it passed to the Ministry of Aviation, then the Ministry of Technology in 1967, Ministry of Aviation Supply in 1970, and then to the Ministry of Defence in 1971.

The A&AEE has witnessed many significant developments in the British aviation industry, including trials of many aircraft flown by the British armed forces since the Second World War, such as the first flights of the English Electric P 1, forerunner of the Lightning, and the BAC TSR.2. The site was shared with  the School of Aviation Medicine. In terms of amenities, the establishment was equipped with some  impressive test facilities such as a wind tunnel (supporting speeds up to ), a large environmental hangar (creating temperatures between −40 °C to +50 °C and humidities up to 100%) and a weighbridge that can weigh and determine the centre of gravity of aircraft up to 135 tons.

In 1992, the A&AEE was renamed the Aircraft and Armament Evaluation Establishment when experimental work moved to the Defence Research Agency. Responsibility for the site passed from the MoD Procurement Executive to the Defence Test and Evaluation Organisation (DTEO) in 1993, and subsequently to the Defence Evaluation and Research Agency (DERA) in 1995. In 2001 DERA was split into two parts, one being the Defence Science and Technology Laboratory (Dstl) which remains within the civil service, and the rest going to form part of the company QinetiQ to which the staff at Boscombe Down were transferred.

Organisation
The A&AEE's wartime organisation was two squadrons for testing aircraft and armaments, and a small number of flights. The establishment also hosted attached units and for a period (1943–45) the Empire Test Pilots School.

Performance Testing Squadron
 Three pre-war flights plus another raised during the war. Reorganised as A to D squadrons in 1944.

Armament Testing Squadron
 Three flights. Reorganised as flights in squadrons A and B and a Special Duties flight in 1944.
 A (Gunnery) Flight
 B (Bombing) Flight
 C (Special Duty Flight)

Others
 High Altitude Flight
 Intensive Flying Development Unit
 Gun Proofing Flight
 BATDU/WIDU/109 Squadron (1939–1942)

Lodger and attached
 No. 58 Squadron RAF
 No. 56 Squadron RAF
 No. 249 Squadron RAF
 Handling Flight CFS
 Bomber Development Unit

Commanding officers
 Group Captain B McEntegart
 Group Captain R S Sorley
 Air Commodore R B Mansell
 Air Commodore D D'Arcy A. Greig
 Air Commodore J N Boothman – he had been a pre-war A&AEE pilot
 Air Commodore H P Fraser

See also
 Telecommunications Research Establishment
 Royal Aircraft Establishment
 Royal Radar Establishment
 Seaplane Experimental Station
 Central Fighter Establishment

References

Notes

Bibliography

 Mason, Tim. The Secret Years: Flight Testing at Boscombe Down, 1939–1945. Crowborough, UK: Hikoki Publications, 2010. .

Military units and formations established in 1918
Military units and formations disestablished in 1992
Military research establishments of the United Kingdom
Military history of Suffolk
Military history of Wiltshire
Research institutes in Suffolk
Research institutes in Wiltshire